Gerlind is a German female given name. Notable people with the name include:
Gerlind Ahnert, actress in 1967 East German film Meine Freundin Sybille
Gerlind Beyrichen, German sprinter, bronze medalist in Athletics at the 1967 Summer Universiade
Gerlind Cornell Borchers (1925–2014), German actress
Gerlind Plonka, German mathematician
Gerlind Reinshagen (born 1926), German writer
Gerlind Scheller (born 1967), German synchronized swimmer